Mystery, The Mystery, Mysteries or The Mysteries may refer to:

Arts, entertainment, and media

Fictional characters
Mystery, a cat character in Emily the Strange

Films 
 Mystery (2012 film), a 2012 Chinese drama film
 Mystery (2014 film), a 2014 Chinese suspense thriller adventure film 
 Mystery, Alaska (1999), a comedy-drama film

Genres
 Mystery fiction, a genre of detective fiction
 Mystery film, a genre in cinema

Literature
 Mysteries (novel) or Mysterie, an 1892 existentialist novel by Knut Hamsun
 Mystery (novel), a 1990 novel by American author Peter Straub
 The Mystery (1907), a novel by Samuel Hopkins Adams

Newspapers
 Mystery (newspaper), an African American newspaper by Martin Delany

Music

Groups
 Mystery (band), a Canadian progressive-rock band formed in 1986

Albums and EPs
 Mystery (Blk Jks EP), 2009
 Mystery (Mystery EP), 1992
 Mystery (RAH Band album), 1985
 Mystery (Faye Wong album), 1994
 Mystery, a 1984 album by Vanilla Fudge
 Mystery, a 2006 album Evonne Hsu
 Myst3ry, a 2016 EP by Ladies' Code
 The Mystery (album)

Songs
"Mystery" (Live song), 2006
"Mystery", a song by Dio from the 1984 album The Last in Line
"Mystery", a song by Hugh Laurie from the television series A Bit of Fry & Laurie
"Mystery", a song by Miles Davis from the 1992 album Doo-Bop
"Mystery", a song by Sara Groves from the album Invisible Empires
"Mystery", a song by The Manhattan Transfer, covered by Anita Baker
"Mystery", a song by The Olivia Tremor Control from the album Black Foliage: Animation Music Volume One
"Mystery", a song by Wipers from the 1980 album Is This Real?

Television

Series
 Mystery (television), a children's television show
 Mystery!, a long-running PBS program showcasing British detective fiction

Other uses in television
 "Mystery" (Pee-wee's Playhouse), an episode of the children's show Pee-wee's Playhouse
 Mystery TV, a Canadian digital television channel
 Ion Mystery, an American digital television channel formerly branded as Mystery

People
 Mystery (pickup artist) (born 1971), stage name of entertainer Erik Von Markovik

Religion and ancient culture
 Mystery play, such as the Passion play
 Sacred mysteries, beliefs which cannot be explained by normal reasoning, or esoteric teachings which are kept secret from the non-initiated
 Greco-Roman mysteries, ancient religious cults whose rituals were not revealed to outsiders; the most famous were the Eleusinian Mysteries

Vessels
 Mystery, a cutter built in 1863 by Peter Hedland and subsequently captained by him on journeys to Western Australia
 Mystery (log canoe), a Chesapeake Bay log canoe
 Mystery (lugger), a Mount's Bay lugger which made a voyage from Cornwall to Australia in 1855
 Spirit of Mystery, a modern recreation of Mystery
 , the name of more than one proposed or actual United States Navy ships

Other uses
The Mystery, Wavertree Playground of England
Sunbeam 1000 HP Mystery, car that held the land-speed record

See also

 Anomaly (disambiguation), a deviation or departure from the normal
 Fushigi (disambiguation), Japanese for "mystery" or "secret"
 Mystère (disambiguation)
 Mysterious (disambiguation)
 Mystery watch
 Secret
 Unsolved problem